Bošnjaci is a village and municipality in Vukovar-Syrmia County in eastern Croatia. The 2011 census listed a total of 3,855 inhabitants, 98.8% of whom identified themselves as Croats.

See also
 Spačva basin

References

External links
 

Municipalities of Croatia
Populated places in Syrmia
Populated places in Vukovar-Syrmia County